Rich County is a county in the U.S. state of Utah. As of the 2010 United States Census, the population was 2,264, making it the third-least populous county in Utah. Its county seat is Randolph, and the largest town is Garden City. The county was created in 1864. It was named for an early LDS apostle, Charles C. Rich.

The southern half of Bear Lake and the Bear Lake Valley lies on the northern edge of the county. The Bear River Valley lies in most of the eastern portion of the county. Because of the high elevation, the climate is cold in winter and mild in summer, and the population is limited.

History
Rich County was believed to have first been visited by European-descended explorers in 1811, when trapper Joseph Miller discovered the Bear River. In 1827, the first annual rendezvous of trappers occurred on the south shore of Bear Lake, a tradition that is still marked today. The site is also preserved as part of Bear Lake State Park. The Oregon Trail, a heavily traveled route to the Northwest Territories, passed through the upper part of the future county (as defined by its original description). Many emigrants traveling to the NW Territories also traveled around the south end of Bear Lake instead of hewing to the more heavily traveled route through present-day Idaho, although this adds to the Oregon Trail is usually not shown on maps of the route. The Utah Territory had been initially settled by Mormon pioneers beginning in 1847, but no Mormons moved into the Rich County area until after 1862. The US Congress passed the Homestead Act of 1862, opening this area to settlement. Mormon leader Brigham Young, fearing this would lead to an influx of non-Mormons, called members of his flock to move to the area and begin its settlement. The first settlement within the county's present boundary was Round Valley in 1863; located southwest of Laketown (settled 1864), it is now a ghost town. Randolph was settled in 1870. Originally created as Richland County on January 16, 1864, the name was shortened to Rich on January 29, 1868, by the 17th Utah Territorial Legislature. The boundary as originally defined extended beyond Utah into southwestern Wyoming and southeast Idaho. However, on July 25, 1868, the Wyoming Territory was created by the federal government, and all of the Rich County area east of the 111-degree line of longitude became part of the new territory and thus was lost to Rich. The 1870 census for Rich County, Utah Territory enumerates a total of 1,672 residents in the eight Idaho communities of Bennington, Bloomington, Fish Haven, Liberty, Montpelier, Ovid, Paris and St. Charles. Utah Territory adjusted the county's boundary on February 16, 1872, by moving a small portion previous Summit County into Rich. The final adjustment to county boundaries was made on January 5, 1875, when Idaho Territory took the eight aforementioned communities and others in the Bear Lake Valley to form Bear Lake County.

The present county building was constructed in Randolph in 1940.

Geography
Rich County lies in the upper northeastern corner of Utah. Its northern border abuts the south border of the state of Idaho, and its east border abuts the west border of the state of Wyoming. The Bear River flows eastward out of the middle part of the county into Wyoming. The terrain is rugged, with less than ten percent of the area under cultivation. Over half of the county's area is used for cattle grazing. The county terrain slopes from the Bear River Mountain crests which form its western border, toward the east. The highest point is along its northern border known as Bridger Peak, at 9,255' (2820m) ASL.

The Bear River Valley is created by the Bear River and consists of the east-central portion of the county. The towns of Randolph and Woodruff lie in this farming-oriented valley. Its high elevation makes this region one of the coldest areas in the state. Snow is heavy in late autumn, winter, and early spring and remains on the ground for the entire winter.

Further to the north lies the southern half of Bear Lake Valley, which contains Bear Lake. This lake is famous for its deep blue water, beaches, and surrounding mountains. The Bear River Mountains lies along the western edge of the county, and Logan Canyon opens up to the west of Garden City, which is a quaint tourist town that lies on the western edge of Bear Lake. Laketown lies at the southern edge of the lake. Three sections of the coastline are protected by Bear Lake State Park. The eastern slopes of the Bear River Range are an increasingly popular location for cabins.

In both major valleys, temperature inversions are a major problem during winter. These temperature inversions can bring extremely cold temperatures, fog, smog, and haze to the valleys, lasting for weeks at a time.

Major highways
 U.S. Route 89 descends from the Bear River Mountains through Logan Canyon and turns north at Garden City along the Bear Lake shoreline. 
 State Route 16 heads south from Sage Creek Junction through Randolph and Woodruff before entering Wyoming northwest of Evanston.
 State Route 30 heads south from Garden City through Laketown and climbs east through the mountains to the Wyoming border.
 State Route 39 heads west into the Wasatch Range from Woodruff on its way to Huntsville and eventually Ogden. However, this highway is closed through the mountains during the winter months as heavy snow blocks the road.
 Interstate 80 lies in Summit County near the Rich County border but is only accessible from Rich County through Wyoming.

Adjacent counties

 Bear Lake County, Idaho - north
 Lincoln County, Wyoming - northeast
 Uinta County, Wyoming - southeast
 Summit County - south
 Morgan County - southwest
 Weber County - west
 Cache County - west
 Franklin County, Idaho - northwest

Protected areas
 Cache National Forest (part)
 Bear Lake State Park
  Rendezvous Beach State Park
 Bear Lake Marina State Park
 East Side State Park

Lakes

 Basin Beaver Ponds
 Bear Lake (part)
 Big Spring (in Round Valley)
 Birch Creek Reservoirs
 Birch Creek Reservoir #1
 Birch Creek Reservoir #2
 Blue Grass Pond
 Bluff Spring
 Bug Lake
 Cheney Springs
 Chicken Spring
 Cold Spring
 Cook Reservoir
 Crane Reservoir
 Dairy Ridge Reservoir
 Dry Basin Reservoir
 Dry Canyon Spring
 Dry Hollow Reservoir
 Dry Lake
 Duck Creek Red Spring
 Eagle Springs
 Falula Spring
 Green Fork Reservoir
 Green Fork Sink
 Hatch Spring
 Higgins Hollow Reservoir
 Jacobsen Springs
 Jebo Spring
 Jebo Troughs Spring
 Kearl Reservoir
 Kearl Spring
 Keg Spring (in McKay Hollow)
 Lamb Canyon Spring
 Lewis Spring
 Limestone Reservoir
 Little Crawford Spring
 Little Creek Reservoir
 Little Long Hill Reservoir
 Live Slough
 Lodgepole Reservoir
 Longhurst Spring
 Lower North Eden Reservoir
 McKinnon Spring
 Millie Spring
 Mud Spring (near South Lake)
 Negro Dan Spring
 Neponset Reservoir
 Nick Reservoir
 North Cheney Spring
 North Lake
 Peggy Hollow Spring
 Petes Spring
 Phosphate Spring
 Rabbit Spring (near Big Bend Spring)
 Ranger Spring
 Red Springs
 Richardson Spring
 Rock Spring
 Sage Hollow Reservoir
 Saleratus Reservoir Number 1
 Saleratus Reservoir Number 2
 Saleratus Reservoir Number 3
 Shearing Corral Reservoir
 Six Bit Spring
 Sixmile Reservoir
 South Big Creek Reservoir Number 2
 South Eden Reservoir
 South Lake
 Southwick Spring
 Suttons Reservoir
 Swan Peak Pond
 Swan Spring
 Trough Spring
 Upper North Eden Reservoir
 Wheeler Spring
 Woodruff Reservoir

Demographics

2000 census
As of the 2000 United States Census, there were 1,961 people, 645 households, and 521 families in the county. The population density was 1.91/sqmi (0.75/km2). There were 2,408 housing units at an average density of 2.34/sqmi (0.90/km2). The racial makeup of the county was 98.16% White, 0.05% Native American, 0.41% Asian, 0.92% from other races, and 0.46% from two or more races. 1.84% of the population were Hispanic or Latino of any race.

There were 645 households, out of which 42.20% had children under 18 living with them, 74.40% were married couples living together, 3.70% had a female householder with no husband present, and 19.10% were non-families. 17.10% of all households were made up of individuals, and 7.00% had someone living alone who was 65 years of age or older. The average household size was 3.01, and the average family size was 3.44.

The county population contained 34.60% under 18, 7.20% from 18 to 24, 22.20% from 25 to 44, 21.90% from 45 to 64, and 14.10% who were 65 years of age or older. The median age was 34 years. For every 100 females, there were 103.60 males. For every 100 females aged 18 and over, there were 102.50 males.

The median income for a household in the county was $39,766, and the median income for a family was $44,783. Males had a median income of $34,464 versus $22,396 for females. The per capita income for the county was $16,267. About 6.50% of families and 10.20% of the population were below the poverty line, including 11.30% of those under age 18 and 6.30% of those age 65 or over.

2010 census
As of the 2010 census, the largest self-reported ancestry groups in Rich County were:
40.7% were of English ancestry
14.2% were of German ancestry
10.2% were of Scottish ancestry
8.5% were of "American" ancestry
5.8% were of Irish ancestry
5.6% were of Danish ancestry.

Communities

Towns
 Garden City
 Laketown (originally named "Last Chance")
 Randolph (county seat)
 Woodruff

Census-designated place
 Garden

Former communities
 Argyle
 Pickelville (former town annexed by Garden City in 1979)

Politics and Government
Rich County voters are traditionally Republican. The county has not selected the Democratic Party candidate in a national election since 1944.

See also
 National Register of Historic Places listings in Rich County, Utah

References

External links

 
1864 establishments in Utah Territory
Populated places established in 1864